A tachyon is a hypothetical faster-than-light particle.

Tachyon or tachyonic may also refer to:
 Tachyonic field or tachyon, a field excitation with imaginary mass
 Tachyon (software), ray-tracing software
 Tachyon: The Fringe, a 2000 computer game
 Tachyon Publications, a US book publisher

See also
 Tachyons in fiction
 Tachyon condensation, a process in physics
 Tachyonic antitelephone, a hypothetical communication device
 Agnes Tachyon, a Japanese racehorse
 Takyon (Death Yon), a song by Death Grips
 Tachyon net, a device in the Dune universe
 Tachyon Flyer, a spaceship in the Star Wars universe
 Emperor Percival Tachyon, a Ratchet & Clank character
 Team Tachyon, a department of Tecmo Koei